The 1974 Copa Interamericana was the 4th. edition of the Copa Interamericana. The final was contested by Argentine Club Atlético Independiente (champion of 1974 Copa Libertadores) and Guatemalan team Municipal (winner of 1974 CONCACAF Champions' Cup). The final was played under a two-leg format in November, 1974. Both matches were held in Guatemala City.

In the first leg, hosted at Mateo Flores, Independiente beat Municipal 1–0, while the second leg was won by Municipal 1–0. As both team tied on points and goal difference, a penalty shoot-out was carried out to decide a champion. Independiente won 4–2 on penalties, therefore the Argentine team won their second Interamericana trophy.

Qualified teams

Venue

Both games were held in Estadio Mateo Flores in Guatemala City for economic reasons, after a proposal from Municipal to Independiente. As the match attracted more interest of Guatemalan fans than Argentine supporters, both teams agreed to play the series in Guatemala.

The stadium had been built in 1948, as part of the project to build a group of sports facilities known as Ciudad Olímpica. Originally named "Estadio Olímpico" erroneously, since it has never hosted an olympic competition, the stadium had been inaugurated on February 23, 1950 to host the VI Central American and Caribbean Games. Local long-distance runner Mateo Flores (born Doroteo Guamuch) won the half marathon event there, being also winner of the Boston Marathon in 1952. The stadium was later named after the athlete, died in 2011.

Match details

First Leg

Second Leg

References

Copa Interamericana
i
i
i
i